The Gauteng Province Australian Football League is an Australian rules football competition in South Africa operating out of the province of Gauteng.

History
The league began with Eldorado Park (the Eldos), formed by a development officer in 2002.
In 2003, a club from Pretoria was formed.
Teams from Johannesburg and RAU University were included in 2004.

Clubs
Eldorado Park 
RAU University 
Johannesburg
Pretoria

See also

AFL South Africa
Australian rules football in South Africa
List of Australian rules football leagues outside Australia

References

External links

Australian rules football in South Africa
Sport in Gauteng